Working Designs was an American video game publisher that specialized in the localization of Japanese role-playing video games, strategy video games and top-down shooters for various platforms. Though the company had published many cult hits, it was known best to fans as the long-time exclusive North American publisher of the Lunar series. The company was one of the few game publishers that attempted to bridge the cultural gap between the Japanese and American video game industries during the 1990s with an eclectic selection of releases from various genres, and was also one of the earliest American publishers to make use of the CD-ROM format for full, spoken English dialogue in their titles at a time when voice acting was not a common feature in most mainstream games.

On December 12, 2005, Victor Ireland, President of Working Designs, announced via the company's message board that it was closing its doors. He later started a new company called Gaijinworks.

History
Working Designs was initially founded as a software company focusing on logging management software for the IBM PC. After lead programmer Todd Mark's death in 1988, Victor Ireland was hired to complete Mark's unfinished work before transitioning the company to a game publisher in 1990.

Working Designs published games for the Sega CD and TurboGrafx-CD due to the appeal of the CD medium, instead of the more popular cartridge-based Super Nintendo Entertainment System and Sega Genesis. The company released some of their games with premium packaging for higher prices. They applied foil stamps and extensive artwork to their packaging and supplied games with full color manuals with anime artwork and concept art at a time when many game manuals for Western releases were in greyscale. Also, every manual came with notes describing the translation process and procedure of their games, usually found on the last page of the manual. Every edition of these notes closed with the signature phrase, "We're nothing without you!"

Working Designs became known for their incorporating quirky, distinctively American humor in their translations. President Victor Ireland maintained that the company has always adhered as closely to the original Japanese text as they could while making it understandable to U.S. audiences, and said the addition of American-style humor was necessary to replace Japanese jokes which most Americans would not be able to understand.

When the Sony PlayStation and Sega Saturn were released, Working Designs met with Sony Computer Entertainment America (SCEA, whose president at the time was Bernie Stolar). SCEA said they had no interest in seeing non-action games released for the PlayStation, and as Working Designs published mainly strategy games and RPGs, this led them to begin publishing exclusively for the Sega Saturn. Working Designs had also built a strong working relationship with Sega by this time.

Working Designs often postponed releases for upwards of a year. The final Sega Saturn game released in the US, Magic Knight Rayearth, was delayed for over two years. Following Stolar's departure from Sony, Working Designs began working on games for the PlayStation, for which they released the most single titles on a console (10 titles) in their history, and continued to branch out by introducing their "Spaz" label of arcade-style shoot 'em ups. Following E3 1997, where Ireland complained that Sega of America assigned them an out-of-the-way booth and was giving away information about the upcoming Dreamcast console to the detriment of the Saturn market, Working Designs announced they would publish no more Saturn games beyond the four that were then in progress. The company finally managed to get the rights to Arc the Lad and its sequels, which Sony's new management insisted that they bundle together as one game. Ireland's feud with Sega led them to ignore Sega's Dreamcast in favor of the PlayStation 2, but friction with Sony's approval process was starting to cost Working Designs money.

Working Designs did not publish for the Nintendo GameCube or Microsoft's Xbox system. Ireland had been pursuing the rights to titles on both consoles, but kept finding himself outbid on the few titles that matched his company's skills. When asked why he passed on Lunar Legend for the Game Boy Advance, a title he already owned the right of first-refusal on, he said it was because the game was mediocre and because he still disliked the expense of publishing cartridges. He initially dismissed the Nintendo DS, saying that although production costs had come down significantly, the high wait times were still costly, and endorsed Sony's PlayStation Portable (PSP) and may have been pursuing titles for that handheld. Upon his company's demise, Ireland quietly withdrew his support of the PSP, and voiced his support for the Xbox 360.

Due to a series of delays, approval snags, and sagging sales, Working Designs announced on December 12, 2005 that all existing staff had been laid off and the company was effectively defunct. In a public statement posted on the message board hosted at Working Designs' official site, President Victor Ireland, though expressing much gratitude for strong core fan support over the years, stated that a series of complications related to the approval of upcoming games for the PlayStation 2 had created a loss of revenue from which the company would not be able to recover. Ireland however went on to express optimism that a possible publishing deal may occur in the future with the support of remaining WD staff, likely for the Xbox 360.

Games published (in alphabetical order)

TurboGrafx-16
Cadash
Cosmic Fantasy 2
Exile
Exile: Wicked Phenomenon
Parasol Stars
Vasteel

Sega CD
Lunar: The Silver Star
Lunar: Eternal Blue
Popful Mail: Magical Fantasy Adventure
Vay

Sega Saturn
Albert Odyssey: Legend of Eldean
Dragon Force
Iron Storm
Magic Knight Rayearth
Sega Ages
Shining Wisdom

PlayStation
Alundra
Arc the Lad Collection
Elemental Gearbolt
Lunar: Silver Star Story Complete
Lunar 2: Eternal Blue Complete
RayStorm
RayCrisis
Silhouette Mirage
Thunder Force V
Vanguard Bandits

PlayStation 2
Growlanser Generations
Gungriffon Blaze
Silpheed: The Lost Planet

References

External links
Working Designs Officially Dead
IGN profile
Moby Games profile
 https://web.archive.org/web/20060207094525/http://www.workingdesigns.com/

 
Defunct video game companies of the United States
Video game companies based in California
Video game publishers
Companies based in Shasta County, California
Redding, California
Video game companies established in 1986
Video game companies disestablished in 2005
1986 establishments in California
2005 disestablishments in California
Defunct companies based in California